David Bystroň (18 November 1982 – 19 May 2017) was a Czech professional footballer who played as a centre-back, spending most of his career in the Czech First League with Baník Ostrava. He also played for Viktoria Plzeň, Sigma Olomouc and Bulgarian side Levski Sofia. He represented the Czech Republic internationally at youth levels U17, U18, U20 and U21.

Career

Baník Ostrava
Bystroň played seven seasons for Czech side Baník Ostrava, where he became a champion in 2004 and won the Czech Cup in 2005.

Levski Sofia
Bystroň signed for Levski Sofia on 22 June 2008. Bystroň signed a three-year contract on 27 June 2008. He made his unofficial debut for Levski on 5 July 2008 in a friendly match against Spartak Pleven. Levski won the match and the result was 5–0.

Bystroň made his official debut for Levski on 13 August 2008 in a match against BATE Borisov. The result was 0–1 with a home loss. Bystroň scored his first goal for Levski on 17 August 2008 in a match against Botev Plovdiv. He became a Champion of Bulgaria in 2009.

Viktoria Plzeň
Bystroň joined Viktoria Plzeň on loan on 12 August 2009. He played there until the end of the 2009/10 season. He won the Czech Cup in 2010 with Viktoria Plzeň.

After a period on loan, he was bought by Viktoria.

On 6 December 2011, Bystroň scored a goal in the 2–2 draw with Milan in a UEFA Champions League match.

Doping ban
After a UEFA Champions League match against BATE Borisov in November 2011, Bystroň tested positive for prohibited substance methamphetamine in a drug test. In January 2012, the 'B' sample also tested positive for the substance. He commenced a two-year ban from professional football starting on 3 January 2012, due to finish on 3 January 2014. His contract with Plzeň was terminated on 13 February 2012.

Later career
After he had been cleared for playing again, he signed for Olomouc in the Czech National Football League. In 2016, he joined Swiss amateur club FC Linth in the Swiss fifth league. In 2017, he moved to another Swiss amateur club, US Schluein Ilanz.

Death
On 19 May 2017, multiple news sources reported that Bystroň had committed suicide by hanging himself in his house in Ilanz, Switzerland. Coincidentally, his death occurred less than a month since František Rajtoral, a former teammate and defensive partner at Viktoria Plzeň, had committed a similar suicide.

Honours
 Champion of Bulgaria 2008-09
 Champion of the Czech Republic 2003–04, 2010–11
 Czech Cup 2004-05, 2009–10

References

External links
 David at Levski Official Site 
 FC Levski Sofia profile  
 Profile at Levskisofia.info 
 FC Baník Ostrava profile 
 
 

1982 births
2017 suicides
People from Levoča
Sportspeople from the Prešov Region
Czech footballers
Association football central defenders
Czech Republic youth international footballers
Czech Republic under-21 international footballers
Czech First League players
FC Baník Ostrava players
FC Viktoria Plzeň players
First Professional Football League (Bulgaria) players
PFC Levski Sofia players
Doping cases in association football
Czech sportspeople in doping cases
SK Sigma Olomouc players
Suicides by hanging in Switzerland
Czech expatriate footballers
Czech expatriate sportspeople in Bulgaria
Expatriate footballers in Bulgaria
Czech expatriate sportspeople in Switzerland
Expatriate footballers in Switzerland